The Inglis Sires', registered as the Sires Produce Stakes, is an Australian Turf Club Group 1 Thoroughbred horse race for two-year-olds at Set Weights run over a distance of 1,400 metres at Randwick Racecourse, Sydney, Australia in April during the ATC Championships Carnival.  The prize money is $1,000,000.

History
The race was first run over one mile in 1867 and won by Glencoe.
The race between 1905 and 1908 was run over 6 furlongs.

This race forms the middle leg of the Australian two-year-old "Triple Crown", which also consists of the Golden Slipper Stakes (1,200m) and the Champagne Stakes (1,600m).

Name
Since 2014 the race has been run as the Inglis Sires'.

1933 racebook

Winners

 2022 - Fireburn
 2021 - Anamoe
 2020 - King's Legacy
 2019 - Microphone
 2018 - El Dorado Dreaming
 2017 - Invader
 2016 - Yankee Rose
 2015 - Pride Of Dubai
 2014 - Peggy Jean
 2013 - Guelph
 2012 - Pierro
 2011 - Helmet
 2010 - Yosei
 2009 - Manhattan Rain
 2008 - Sebring
 2007 - Camarilla
 2006 - Excites
 2005 - Fashions Afield
 2004 - Dance Hero
 2003 - Hasna
 2002 - Victory Vein
 2001 - Viscount
 2000 - Assertive Lad
 1999 - Align
 1998 - Alf
 1997 - Encounter
 1996 - Merlene
 1995 - Octagonal
 1994 - St. Covet
 1993 - Tristalove
 1992 - Burst
 1991 - Tierce
 1990 - Rhythmic Charm
 1989 - Reganza
 1988 - Comely Girl
 1987 - Snippets
 1986 - Diamond Shower
 1985 - Wonga Prince
 1984 - Victory Prince
 1983 - Keepers
 1982   - Mighty Manitou 
 1981   - Full On Aces 
 1980   - Shaybisc 
 1979   - Zephyr Zip 
 1978   - Karaman 
 1977   - Luskin Star 
 1976   - Desirable 
 1975   - Toy Show 
 1974   - Gretel 
 1973   - Tontonan 
 1972   - Sovereign Slipper 
 1971   - Latin Knight 
 1970   - Baguette 
 1969   - Beau Babylon 
 1968   - Black Onyx 
 1967   - Ruling Ways 
 1966   - Prince Max 
 1965   - Peace Council 
 1964   - Eskimo Prince 
 1963   - Time And Tide
 1962   - Bogan Road 
 1961   - Young Brolga 
 1960   - Wenona Girl 
 1959   - Fine And Dandy 
 1958   - Man Of Iron 
 1957   - Tulloch
 1956   - Gay Sierra 
 1955   - Kingster 
 1954   - Lindbergh 
 1953   - Royal Stream 
 1952   - Pure Fire 
 1951   - Ocean Bound 
 1950   - True Course 
 1949   - Field Boy 
 1948   - Riptide 
 1947   - Temeraire 
 1946   - Flying Duke 
 1945   - Magnificent 
 1944   - Shannon
 1943   - Mayfowl 
 1942   - Hall Stand 
 1941   - Yaralla 
 1940   - Lucrative 
 1939   - Reading 
 1938   - Nuffield 
 1937   - Ajax 
 1936   - Gold Rod 
 1935   - Young Idea
 1934   - Dark Sky 
 1933   - Hall Mark 
 1932   - Kuvera 
 1931   - Ammon Ra 
 1930   - The Doctor's Orders 
 1929   - Honour 
 1928   - Mollison 
 1927   - Royal Feast 
 1926   - Cyden 
 1925   - Los Gatos 
 1924   - Leslie Wallace 
 1923   - The Monk 
 1922   - Soorak 
 1921   - Furious 
 1920   - Glenacre  
 1919   - Millieme
 1918   - Outlook 
 1917   - Thrice 
 1916   - Thana 
 1915   - Cetigne 
 1914   - Imshi 
 1913   - Radnor 
 1912   - Wolawa 
 1911   - Gillamatong 
 1910   - Beverage 
 1909   - Prince Foote 
 1908   - Malt Queen 
 1907   - The Owl 
 1906   - Collarit 
 1905   - Binnia 
 1904 - 1894 - no race 
 1893   - Light Artillery 
 1892   - Autonomy 
 1891   - Stromboli 
 1890   - Titan 
 1889   - Rudolph 
 1888   - Miss Thirza 
 1887   - Abercorn 
 1886   - Trident 
 1885   - Uralla 
 1884   - Garfield 
 1883   - Warwick 
 1882   - Jessie 
 1881   - Spinningdale 
 1880   - Geraldine/Kamilaroi
 1879   - Nellie 
 1878   - His Lordship 
 1877   - Chester
 1876   - Robinson Crusoe 
 1875   - Malta 
 1874   - Kingsborough 
 1873   - Rose D'amour 
 1872   - Lecturer 
 1871   - Hamlet 
 1870   - Lady Clifden 
 1869   - Paradise 
 1868   - Coquette 
 1867   - Glencoe

Notes:
  Date of race rescheduled due to postponement of the Easter Saturday meeting because of the heavy track conditions. The meeting was moved to Easter Monday, 6 April 2015.
  Dead heat

See also
List of Australian Group races

References

External links 
First three placegetters Sires Produce Stakes (ATC)

Flat horse races for two-year-olds
Group 1 stakes races in Australia
Randwick Racecourse